Denis Barrett,  MBE was an Anglican priest in New Zealand in the 20th century.

Barrett was  ordained a deacon  in 1959 and a priest in 1960. He was Chaplain to the  Bishop of Nelson then Vicar of Waimea from 1960 to 1966; and of Wairau from 1966 to 1970. He was  Archdeacon of Māwhera from 1970 until 1976.

References

20th-century New Zealand Anglican priests
Archdeacons of Māwhera
Members of the Order of the British Empire